Siddharth Desai (born 5 December 1991) is an Indian kabaddi player, who currently represents VIVO Pro Kabaddi franchise Telugu Titans. He had previously represented Air India and Maharashtra before making his Pro Kabaddi debut in Season 6 with U Mumba. Desai was the costliest player in the Season 7 auction when Telugu Titans bid a whopping ₹1.45 Crore to secure his services. he is one of the most decorated kabaddi player in India.

Early life 
Desai comes from a family of kabaddi enthusiasts with his father and brother, Suraj also known to have played the sport. While continuing to actively pursue kabaddi from a young age, Desai under the guidance of his parents and brother also completed his academics. After studying science in 12th grade, Desai graduated from college as a BSc in Physics. Apart from kabaddi, Desai also enjoys playing the guitar and singing. He views the instrument as a stressbuster whenever upset and is known to play it for at least an hour a day. Desai even has a YouTube channel where he uploads some renditions of his favourite songs.

Kabaddi career 
Pro Kabaddi career

Season 6 

After impressing during a triumphant tournament with Maharashtra at the Nationals, Desai got his big break in Pro Kabaddi. He enjoyed a highly successful debut season with U Mumba and became the fastest rookie to reach 200 raid points after finishing with 218 raid points from 21 appearances. He was also the fastest ever to 50 raid points, joint-fastest to 100 raid points and had an incredible strike rate of 89.13 in Do-Or-Die raid attempts.

Records and achievements
 VIVO Pro Kabaddi Best Debutant (2019)
Most raid points in a single season for telugu titans ever 217. (Season-7)

References 

1991 births
Living people
Pro Kabaddi League players